Babīte Municipality is a former municipality in Latvia. The municipality was formed in 2009 when Babīte parish and Sala parish merged with the administrative centre becoming Piņķi.

On 1 July 2021, Babīte Municipality ceased to exist and its territory was merged into Mārupe Municipality

See also 
 Administrative divisions of Latvia (2009)

References 

 
Former municipalities of Latvia